The Romanian Volleyball Player of the Year has been chosen annually by the Romanian Volleyball Federation.

Women's Volleyball Player of the Year

Volleyball Player of the Year

References
  

A
Volleyball awards
Annual events in Romania